Ashford Sastri Sinanan  (2 January 1923 – 1994) was a politician from Trinidad and Tobago who served in various roles prior to and following Trinidad and Tobago’s independence in 1962. Along with his brother, Mitra, Sinanan helped draft portions of Trinidad’s constitution and later went on to serve as the country’s first High Commissioner to India. High office, however, ultimately eluded him: first, in his 1958 bid to become the first Prime Minister of the Federation of the West Indies, a contest that he narrowly lost by 2 seats to Barbados’ Sir Grantley Adams; and second, in 1974, when he resigned from his post as High Commissioner to India to found the West Indian National Party (WINP). The WINP ultimately failed to break the 20-year rule of then Prime Minister, Eric Williams.

Notable career highlights:
 Elected to Legislative Council, Victoria Constituency (1950)
 Member of Parliament, San Fernando
 Founder, Democratic Labour Party and Opposition Leader (1951–1956) 
 Acting Speaker of the House, Parliament of Trinidad and Tobago (1955–1956)
 Chairman, Constitution Reform Committee (1955)
 Ambassador and Permanent Representative of Trinidad and Tobago to the Office of the U.N. and Specialized Agencies in Geneva (1973)
 High Commissioner to India (1974)

Awards 
 Chaconia Gold Medal awarded for Public Service (1990)

See also
 George F. Fitzpatrick
 Politics of Trinidad and Tobago

References

 Hoyes, F. A. The Rise of West Indian Democracy: The Life and Times of Sir Grantley Adams. Advocate Press (1963).
 Grey, Ian, The Parliamentarians: The History of the Commonwealth Parliamentary Association, 1911–1985, The University of Michigan, Gower, 1986.
 Mahabir, Winston, In and Out of Politics: Tales of the government of Dr. Eric Williams, from the Notebooks of a Former Minister, The University of Virginia Press, 1978.
 Sinanan, Mitra, Constitution Commission of Trinidad and Tobago, 1974.
 Palmer, Colin, Eric Williams and the Making of the Modern Caribbean, 1974.
 "Head of New Party Says He Will Be Prime Minister", The Virgin Islands Daily News, 28 May 1974.

Members of the Legislative Council of Trinidad and Tobago
High Commissioners of Trinidad and Tobago to India
Democratic Labour Party (Trinidad and Tobago) politicians
Trinidad and Tobago Presbyterians
Permanent Representatives of Trinidad and Tobago to the United Nations
1994 deaths
1923 births
People from San Fernando, Trinidad and Tobago
Members of the Federal Parliament of the West Indies Federation
Members of the House of Representatives (Trinidad and Tobago)
20th-century Trinidad and Tobago politicians